Maxates acutissima is a moth of the family Geometridae first described by Francis Walker in 1861. It is found in India and Sri Lanka.

Two subspecies are recognized.
Maxates acutissima goniaria Felder, 1875
Maxates acutissima perplexata Prout, 1933

References

Moths of Asia
Moths described in 1893